Inskip Point is a peninsula in the north of the locality of Inskip to the north of the town of Rainbow Beach in south-east Queensland, Australia. It is the vehicular gateway to Fraser Island (also known as K'Gari and Gari), a popular recreational area.

It lies between Tin Can Bay to the South West and Great Sandy Strait to the North and curves back towards Rainbow Beach and the Coral Sea to the East.

The southern tip of Fraser Island, Hook Point lies some 1,200 metres north of Inskip Point, the northern tip of the peninsula. Two ferry services run between Inskip Point and Hook Point during daylight hours.

The black-breasted buttonquail, a restricted-range endemic buttonquail, was once found in sand-dunes on the peninsula. Its current numbers are now assumed to be one. Mike West, former president of Birds Queensland, blames dingoes and wild dogs for hunting the population to extinction. West suggests trapping dingoes and wild dogs, setting them free if they are pure dingoes and killing them if they are not.

References

External links
 Queensland Parks and Wildlife Service page about the Inskip Peninsula
 Australia Parks page about the Inskip Peninsula

Headlands of Queensland
Gympie Region